A number of vessels of the German Navy have borne the name Bayern, after Bavaria.

 , a  that served from 1965 to 1993 before being scrapped in 1998.

References 

German Navy ship names